Martina Šindlerová (born 29 June 1988 in Bratislava, Slovakia), also known as Martina Schindlerova, is a Slovak singer who rose to popularity after placing second in Slovensko hľadá SuperStar, the Slovak version of Pop Idol, shown by STV.

Slovensko hľadá SuperStar Performances

Discography

Albums
Slovensko hľadá Superstar Top 11 (April 2005)
Patríme K Sebe (October 2005)
Čo sa to tu deje (May 2008)

Singles
'Je T'aime
Neutekám
 "Birds of Paradise"
 "Len sám Boh vie"

See also
 The 100 Greatest Slovak Albums of All Time

References

External links

Official Site (In Slovak)

1988 births
Living people
Idols (franchise) participants
21st-century Slovak women singers